Constantinos Mintikkis (born 14 July 1989) is a former Cypriot footballer.

International
On 15 November 2014, he had his first called in Cyprus national football team for the UEFA Euro 2016 qualifying match against Andorra on 16 November 2014. He was on bench.

He made his international debut on 6 September 2019 in a 2020 Euro qualifier against Kazakhstan, as a starter.

References

External links
 
 Ο Μιντίκκης βρήκε την... Ιθάκη του! 
 Constantinos Mintikkis: Statistics 2013/14 
 Constantinos Mintikkis: Statistics 2014/15 
 

1989 births
Living people
Cypriot footballers
Cyprus international footballers
Association football midfielders
Cypriot First Division players
Cypriot Second Division players
Anorthosis Famagusta F.C. players
Nea Salamis Famagusta FC players
ENTHOI Lakatamia FC players
ASIL Lysi players
Omonia Aradippou players
AEK Larnaca FC players
Ethnikos Assia FC players
Digenis Akritas Morphou FC players